Županja is a town in eastern Slavonia, Croatia, located 254 km east of Zagreb. It is administratively part of the Vukovar-Syrmia County. It is inhabited by 12,090 people (2011).

Županja lies on the Sava river opposite Bosnia and Herzegovina, and is the site of a border-crossing bridge with the town of Orašje in Bosnia and Herzegovina. The A3 highway Zagreb-Slavonski Brod-Belgrade passes north of it, and the city is also reachable by a local railroad from Vinkovci as well as the state road D55. The 2011 census recorded 96.72% Croats in the municipality.

History
Županja was ruled by Ottoman Empire between 1536 and 1687 as part of Sanjak of Syrmia. Since the Treaty of Karlowitz in 1699, until 1918, Županja (named ZUPANJE when a post-office  was opened in 1861) remained in the Austrian monarchy (Kingdom of Croatia-Slavonia after the compromise of 1867), in the Slavonian Military Frontier, under the administration of the Brooder Grenz-Infanterie-Regiment N°VII until 1881. In the late 19th and early 20th century, Županja was a district capital in the Kingdom Syrmia County. From 1929 to 1939, Županja was part of the Sava Banovina and from 1939 to 1941 of the Banovina of Croatia within the Kingdom of Yugoslavia.

Demographics

Gallery

Notable people
Pero Galić, Croatian singer and founder of rock band Opća Opasnost
Srećko Albini (1869–1933), Croatian composer, conductor, and music publisher
Melita Lorković, Croatian female pianist, university professor and music pedagogue (1907-1987)
Amiel Shomrony - cantor of the Jewish community in Zagreb and secretary of Zagreb's chief rabbi Miroslav Šalom Freiberger during the World War II
Dario Župarić, Croatian footballer (b. 1992)

See also
 Spačva basin

References

External links

 

Cities and towns in Croatia
Populated places in Syrmia
Slavonia
Bosnia and Herzegovina–Croatia border crossings
Populated places in Vukovar-Syrmia County
Syrmia County